An endosymbiont or endobiont is any organism that lives within the body or cells of another organism most often, though not always, in a mutualistic relationship.
(The term endosymbiosis is from the Greek: ἔνδον endon "within", σύν syn "together" and βίωσις biosis "living".) Examples are nitrogen-fixing bacteria (called rhizobia), which live in the root nodules of legumes, single-cell algae inside reef-building corals and bacterial endosymbionts that provide essential nutrients to insects.

The history behind the concept of endosymbiosis stems from the postulates of the endosymbiotic theory. The endosymbiotic theory (symbiogenesis) pushes the notion of bacteria exclusively living in eukaryotic organisms after being engulfed by them. This is popular with the concept of organelle development observed with eukaryotes. Two major types of organelle in eukaryotic cells, mitochondria and plastids such as chloroplasts, are considered to be bacterial endosymbionts.

There are two types of symbiont transmissions. In horizontal transmission, each new generation acquires free living symbionts from the environment. An example is the nitrogen-fixing bacteria in certain plant roots. Vertical transmission takes place when the symbiont is transferred directly from parent to offspring. It is also possible for both to be involved in a mixed-mode transmission, where symbionts are transferred vertically for some generation before a switch of host occurs and new symbionts are horizontally acquired from the environment.

In vertical transmissions, the symbionts often have a reduced genome and are no longer able to survive on their own. As a result, the symbiont depends on the host, resulting in a highly intimate co-dependent relationship. For instance, pea aphid symbionts have lost genes for essential molecules, now relying on the host to supply them with nutrients. In return, the symbionts synthesize essential amino acids for the aphid host. Other examples include Wigglesworthia nutritional symbionts of tse-tse flies, or in sponges. When a symbiont reaches this stage, it begins to resemble a cellular organelle, similar to mitochondria or chloroplasts.

Many instances of endosymbiosis are obligate; that is, either the endosymbiont or the host cannot survive without the other, such as the gutless marine worms of the genus Riftia, which get nutrition from their endosymbiotic bacteria. The most common examples of obligate endosymbioses are mitochondria and chloroplasts. Some human parasites, e.g. Wuchereria bancrofti and Mansonella perstans, thrive in their intermediate insect hosts because of an obligate endosymbiosis with Wolbachia spp. They can both be eliminated from hosts by treatments that target this bacterium. However, not all endosymbioses are obligate and some endosymbioses can be harmful to either of the organisms involved.

Symbiogenesis and organelles 

Symbiogenesis explains the origins of eukaryotes, whose cells contain two major kinds of organelle: mitochondria and chloroplasts.  The theory proposes that these organelles evolved from certain types of bacteria that eukaryotic cells engulfed through phagocytosis. These cells and the bacteria trapped inside them entered an endosymbiotic relationship, meaning that the bacteria took up residence and began living exclusively within the eukaryotic cells.

Numerous insect species have endosymbionts at different stages of symbiogenesis. A common theme of symbiogenesis involves the reduction of the genome to only essential genes for the host and symbiont collective genome. A remarkable example of this is the fractionation of the Hodgkinia genome of Magicicada cicadas. Because the cicada life cycle takes years underground, natural selection on endosymbiont populations is relaxed for many bacterial generations. This allows the symbiont genomes to diversify within the host for years with only punctuated periods of selection when the cicadas reproduce. As a result, the ancestral Hodgkinia genome has split into three groups of primary endosymbiont, each encoding only a fraction of the essential genes for the symbiosis. The host now requires all three sub-groups of symbiont, each with degraded genomes lacking most essential genes for bacterial viability.

Bacterial endosymbionts of invertebrates

The best-studied examples of endosymbiosis are known from invertebrates. These symbioses affect organisms with global impact, including Symbiodinium of corals, or Wolbachia of insects. Many insect agricultural pests and human disease vectors have intimate relationships with primary endosymbionts.

Endosymbionts of insects 

Scientists classify insect endosymbionts in two broad categories, 'Primary' and 'Secondary'. Primary endosymbionts (sometimes referred to as P-endosymbionts) have been associated with their insect hosts for many millions of years (from 10 to several hundred million years in some cases). They form obligate associations (see below), and display cospeciation with their insect hosts. Secondary endosymbionts exhibit a more recently developed association, are sometimes horizontally transferred between hosts, live in the hemolymph of the insects (not specialized bacteriocytes, see below), and are not obligate.

Primary endosymbionts 

Among primary endosymbionts of insects, the best-studied are the pea aphid (Acyrthosiphon pisum) and its endosymbiont Buchnera sp. APS, the tsetse fly Glossina morsitans morsitans and its endosymbiont Wigglesworthia glossinidia brevipalpis and the endosymbiotic protists in lower termites. As with endosymbiosis in other insects, the symbiosis is obligate in that neither the bacteria nor the insect is viable without the other. Scientists have been unable to cultivate the bacteria in lab conditions outside of the insect. With special nutritionally-enhanced diets, the insects can survive, but are unhealthy, and at best survive only a few generations.

In some insect groups, these endosymbionts live in specialized insect cells called bacteriocytes (also called mycetocytes), and are maternally-transmitted, i.e. the mother transmits her endosymbionts to her offspring. In some cases, the bacteria are transmitted in the egg, as in Buchnera; in others like Wigglesworthia, they are transmitted via milk to the developing insect embryo. In termites, the endosymbionts reside within the hindguts and are transmitted through trophallaxis among colony members.

The primary endosymbionts are thought to help the host either by providing nutrients that the host cannot obtain itself or by metabolizing insect waste products into safer forms. For example, the putative primary role of Buchnera is to synthesize essential amino acids that the aphid cannot acquire from its natural diet of plant sap. Likewise, the primary role of Wigglesworthia, it is presumed, is to synthesize vitamins that the tsetse fly does not get from the blood that it eats. In lower termites, the endosymbiotic protists play a major role in the digestion of lignocellulosic materials that constitute a bulk of the termites' diet.

Bacteria benefit from the reduced exposure to predators and competition from other bacterial species, the ample supply of nutrients and relative environmental stability inside the host.

Genome sequencing reveals that obligate bacterial endosymbionts of insects have among the smallest of known bacterial genomes and have lost many genes that are commonly found in closely related bacteria. Several theories have been put forth to explain the loss of genes. It is presumed that some of these genes are not needed in the environment of the host insect cell. A complementary theory suggests that the relatively small numbers of bacteria inside each insect decrease the efficiency of natural selection in 'purging' deleterious mutations and small mutations from the population, resulting in a loss of genes over many millions of years. Research in which a parallel phylogeny of bacteria and insects was inferred supports the belief that the primary endosymbionts are transferred only vertically (i.e., from the mother), and not horizontally (i.e., by escaping the host and entering a new host).

Attacking obligate bacterial endosymbionts may present a way to control their insect hosts, many of which are pests or carriers of human disease. For example, aphids are crop pests and the tsetse fly carries the organism Trypanosoma brucei that causes African sleeping sickness. Other motivations for their study involve understanding the origins of symbioses in general, as a proxy for understanding e.g. how chloroplasts or mitochondria came to be obligate symbionts of eukaryotes or plants.

Secondary endosymbionts 

The pea aphid (Acyrthosiphon pisum) is known to contain at least three secondary endosymbionts, Hamiltonella defensa, Regiella insecticola, and Serratia symbiotica. Hamiltonella defensa defends its aphid host from parasitoid wasps. This defensive symbiosis improves the survival of aphids, which have lost some elements of the insect immune response.

One of the best-understood defensive symbionts is the spiral bacteria Spiroplasma poulsonii. Spiroplasma sp. can be reproductive manipulators, but also defensive symbionts of Drosophila flies. In Drosophila neotestacea, S. poulsonii has spread across North America owing to its ability to defend its fly host against nematode parasites. This defence is mediated by toxins called "ribosome-inactivating proteins" that attack the molecular machinery of invading parasites. These Spiroplasma toxins represent one of the first examples of a defensive symbiosis with a mechanistic understanding for defensive symbiosis between an insect endosymbiont and its host.

Sodalis glossinidius is a secondary endosymbiont of tsetse flies that lives inter- and intracellularly in various host tissues, including the midgut and hemolymph. Phylogenetic studies have not indicated a correlation between evolution of Sodalis and tsetse. Unlike tsetse's primary symbiont Wigglesworthia, though, Sodalis has been cultured in vitro.

Many other insects have secondary endosymbionts not reviewed here.

Endosymbionts of ants

Bacteriocyte-associated symbionts 
The most well studied endosymbiont of ants are bacteria of the genus Blochmannia, which are the primary endosymbiont of Camponotus ants. In 2018 a new ant-associated symbiont was discovered in Cardiocondyla ants. This symbiont was named Candidatus Westeberhardia Cardiocondylae and it is also believed to be a primary symbiont.

Endosymbionts of marine invertebrates
Extracellular endosymbionts are also represented in all four extant classes of Echinodermata (Crinoidea, Ophiuroidea, Echinoidea, and Holothuroidea). Little is known of the nature of the association (mode of infection, transmission, metabolic requirements, etc.) but phylogenetic analysis indicates that these symbionts belong to the class Alphaproteobacteria, relating them to Rhizobium and Thiobacillus. Other studies indicate that these subcuticular bacteria may be both abundant within their hosts and widely distributed among the Echinoderms in general.

Some marine oligochaeta (e.g., Olavius algarvensis and Inanidrillus spp.) have obligate extracellular endosymbionts that fill the entire body of their host. These marine worms are nutritionally dependent on their symbiotic chemoautotrophic bacteria lacking any digestive or excretory system (no gut, mouth, or nephridia).

The sea slug Elysia chlorotica lives in endosymbiotic relationship with the algae Vaucheria litorea, and the jellyfish Mastigias have a similar relationship with an algae. Elysia chlorotica forms this relationship intracellularly with the chloroplasts from the algae. These chloroplast retain their photosynthetic capabilities and structures for several months after being taken into the cells of the slug.

Dinoflagellate endosymbionts 

Dinoflagellate endosymbionts of the genus Symbiodinium, commonly known as zooxanthellae, are found in corals, mollusks (esp. giant clams, the Tridacna), sponges, and foraminifera. These endosymbionts drive the formation of coral reefs by capturing sunlight and providing their hosts with energy for carbonate deposition.

Previously thought to be a single species, molecular phylogenetic evidence over the past couple decades has shown there to be great diversity in Symbiodinium. In some cases, there is specificity between host and Symbiodinium clade. More often, however, there is an ecological distribution of Symbiodinium, the symbionts switching between hosts with apparent ease. When reefs become environmentally stressed, this distribution of symbionts is related to the observed pattern of coral bleaching and recovery. Thus, the distribution of Symbiodinium on coral reefs and its role in coral bleaching presents one of the most complex and interesting current problems in reef ecology.

Endosymbionts of phytoplankton

In marine environments, bacterial endosymbionts have more recently been discovered. These endosymbiotic relationships are especially prevalent in oligotrophic or nutrient-poor regions of the ocean like that of the North Atlantic. In these oligotrophic waters, cell growth of larger phytoplankton like that of diatoms is limited by low nitrate concentrations.  Endosymbiotic bacteria fix nitrogen for their diatom hosts and in turn receive organic carbon from photosynthesis. These symbioses play an important role in global carbon cycling in oligotrophic regions.

One known symbiosis between the diatom Hemialus spp. and the cyanobacterium Richelia intracellularis has been found in the North Atlantic, Mediterranean, and Pacific Ocean. The Richelia endosymbiont is found within the diatom frustule of Hemiaulus spp., and has a reduced genome likely losing genes related to pathways the host now provides.  Research by Foster et al. (2011) measured nitrogen fixation by the cyanobacterial host Richelia intracellularis well above intracellular requirements, and found the cyanobacterium was likely fixing excess nitrogen for Hemiaulus host cells. Additionally, both host and symbiont cell growth were much greater than free-living Richelia intracellularis or symbiont-free Hemiaulus spp. The Hemaiulus-Richelia symbiosis is not obligatory especially in areas with excess nitrogen (nitrogen replete).

Richelia intracellularis is also found in Rhizosolenia spp., a diatom found in oligotrophic oceans. Compared to the Hemaiulus host, the endosymbiosis with Rhizosolenia is much more consistent, and Richelia intracellularis is generally found in Rhizosolenia. There are some asymbiotic (occurs without an endosymbiont) Rhizosolenia, however there appears to be mechanisms limiting growth of these organisms in low nutrient conditions. Cell division for both the diatom host and cyanobacterial symbiont can be uncoupled and mechanisms for passing bacterial symbionts to daughter cells during cell division are still relatively unknown.

Other endosymbiosis with nitrogen fixers in open oceans include Calothrix in Chaetocerous spp. and UNCY-A in prymnesiophyte microalga.  The Chaetocerous-Calothrix endosymbiosis is hypothesized to be more recent, as the Calothrix genome is generally intact. While other species like that of the UNCY-A symbiont and Richelia have reduced genomes. This reduction in genome size occurs within nitrogen metabolism pathways indicating endosymbiont species are generating nitrogen for their hosts and losing the ability to use this nitrogen independently. This endosymbiont reduction in genome size, might be a step that occurred in the evolution of organelles (above).

Endosymbionts of protists
Mixotricha paradoxa is a protozoan that lacks mitochondria. However, spherical bacteria live inside the cell and serve the function of the mitochondria. Mixotricha also has three other species of symbionts that live on the surface of the cell.

Paramecium bursaria, a species of ciliate, has a mutualistic symbiotic relationship with green alga called Zoochlorella. The algae live inside the cell, in the cytoplasm.

Paulinella chromatophora is a freshwater amoeboid which has recently (evolutionarily speaking) taken on a cyanobacterium as an endosymbiont.

Many foraminifera are hosts to several types of algae, such as red algae, diatoms, dinoflagellates and chlorophyta. These endosymbionts can be transmitted vertically to the next generation via asexual reproduction of the host, but because the endosymbionts are larger than the foraminiferal gametes, they need to acquire new algae again after sexual reproduction.

Several species of radiolaria have photosynthetic symbionts. In some species the host will sometimes digest algae to keep their population at a constant level.

Hatena arenicola is a flagellate protist with a complicated feeding apparaturs that feed on other microbes. But when it engulfs a green alga from the genus Nephroselmis, the feeding apparatus disappears and it becomes photosynthetic. During mitosis the algae is transferred to only one of the two cells, and the cell without the algae needs to start the cycle all over again.

In 1976, biologist Kwang W. Jeon found that a lab strain of Amoeba proteus had been infected by bacteria that lived inside the cytoplasmic vacuoles. This infection killed all the protists except for a few individuals. After the equivalent of 40 host generations, the two organisms gradually became mutually interdependent. Over many years of study, it has been confirmed that a genetic exchange between the prokaryotes and protists had occurred.

Endosymbionts of vertebrates
The spotted salamander (Ambystoma maculatum) lives in a relationship with the algae Oophila amblystomatis, which grows in the egg cases.

Endosymbionts of plants
Plants are diverse photosynthetic eukaryotes having wide variety of cell morphologies and lifestyles. Plants are considered one of the primary producers. Plants with all photosynthetic eukaryotes are dependent on an intracellular organelle known as plastid or chloroplast (in case of plants and green algae). The chloroplast is derived from a cyanobacterial primary endosymbiosis over one billion years ago. The oxygenic photosynthetic free-living cyanobacterium was engulfed and kept by a heterotrophic protist and eventually evolved into the present intracellular organelle over the course of many years.  

The term symbiosis is defined as "living together" of unlike organisms. The symbioses have been recognized and studied since 1879. The plant symbioses can be categorized into epiphytic, endophytic, and mycorrhizal. The mycorrhizal category is only used for fungi. The endosymbiosis relation of plants and endosymbionts can also be categorized into beneficial, mutualistic, neutral, and pathogenic. Typically, most of the studies related to plan symbioses or plant endosymbionts such as endophytic bacteria or fungi, are focused on a single category or specie to better understand the biological processes and functions one at a time. But this approach is not helping to understand the complex endosymbiotic interactions and biological functions in natural habitat. Microorganisms living in association as endosymbionts with plants can enhance the primary productivity of plants either by producing or capturing the limiting resources. These endosymbionts can also enhance the productivity of plants by the production of toxic metabolites helping plant defenses against herbivores . Although, the role and potential of microorganisms in community regulations has been neglected since long, may because of the microscopic size and unseen lifestyle. Theoretically, all the vascular plants harbor endosymbionts (e.g., fungi and bacteria). these endosymbionts colonize the plants cells and tissue predominantly but not exclusively. Plant endosymbionts can be categorized into different types based on the function, relation and location, some common plant endosymbionts are discussed as follow.

Endophytes 
The term endophytic has been defined and discussed multiple times. Generally, the term implies to the organism that is living inside of the plant. More recently it is more focused on the microorganism that live inside the plant tissues and do no harm to the plant. According to the latest definition, the endophytes are those microorganisms which lives in the internal plant tissues for a major part of their life cycle and as long as they don’t induce any infectious or harmful effect to the host plant. These endophytes include includes bacteria, fungi, viruses, protozoa and even microalgae. Endophytes helps plant in biological processes such as growth and development, nutrient uptake and defense against biotic and abiotic stresses like drought, salinity, heat, herbivores etc. The endophytes are in mutualistic relation to the host plant which means that the endophytes are not only helping plants but also get benefits from plant. So, the endophytes can be described as plant endosymbionts.

Fungi as plant endosymbionts 
All vascular plants have fungal and bacterial endophytes or endosymbionts which colonize predominantly but not exclusively, roots. Fungal endosymbionts can be found all out the plant tissues and based on their location in the plant, fungal endosymbionts can be defined in multiple ways like fungi living in plant tissues above the ground are termed as endophytes, while fungi living below the ground (roots) are known as mycorrhizal, but the mycorrhizal fungi also have different names based on their location inside the root which are ecto, endo, arbuscular, ericoid, etc. Furthermore, the fungal endosymbionts living in the roots and extending their extraradical hyphae into the outer rhizosphere are known as ectendosymbionts.

Arbuscular Mycorrhizal Fungi (AMF) 
Among the plant microbial endosymbionts arbuscular mycorrhizal fungi or AMF are the most diverse group. With some exceptions Ericaceae family, almost all vascular plants are harboring the AMF endosymbionts both as endo and ecto as well. The AMF plant endosymbionts systematically colonize the plant roots and helping plant host by soil nutrients and as a return it takes the plant organic carbon sources. Plant roots exudates contain a diversity of secondary metabolites especially flavonoids and strigolactones which acts as chemical signals and attracts the AMF. Arbuscular mycyrrizal fungus Gigaspora margarita not only lives as a plant endosymbiont but also harbor further endosymbiont intracytoplasmic bacterium-like organisms. By isolating the pure cultures of AMF endosymbionts, it has been reported that it has different effects to the different plant hosts. By introducing the AMF of one plant can reduce the net growth of the other plant host which might have to do something with already present AMF. Furthermore, the AMF are reported in numerous studies as plant health and growth promoting and as an alleviating agent for abiotic stresses like salinity, drought, heat, poor nutrition and metal toxicity.

Endophytic Fungi 
In addition to mycorrhizal endosymbionts, the endophytic fungi are also catching the interest of scientist by showing so much potential not only in its mutualistic relation where it is benefiting host plant and taking advantages as well but also showing promising results in other domains like helping plant to grow in polluted environment such as high polluted environment with toxic metals. Fungal endophytes are taxonomically diverse group of omnipresent fungi which is divided into different categories based on mode of transmission, biodiversity, in planta colonization and host plant type. These categories are clavicipitaceous and non-clavicipitaceous, the former one systematically colonizes the temperate season grasses while the later one colonizes higher plants and even roots and that’s why can be divided into further categories. Bacillus amyloliquefaciens is a seed born endophytic fungi which produces gibberellins and promotes the physiology. Bacillus amyloliquefaciens has been evaluated in a study for its growth promoting potential where it promotes the longer height of transgenic dwarf rice plants. Similarly, Aureobasidium and preussia species of endophytic fungi isolated from Boswellia sacra are producing indole acetic acid hormone to promote plant health and development.

Aphids are most common insects and can be found in most of the plants and carnivorous ladybirds are the specialized predators of the aphids. These ladybirds are used in different programs for the pest control. A study conducted on the effect of plant-endophyte symbiosis on the population and fitness of carnivorous ladybirds. The plant endophytic fungus Neotyphodium lolii is producing alkaloid mycotoxins in response to aphid invasions. The ladybirds picking on the aphids from the infected plants exhibited reduced rate of fertility and abnormal reproductive performance. Adult ladybirds were not significantly affected in terms of their body symmetries and size. But the consistently strong negative effects of endophytes overall fitness of ladybirds suggest that the mycotoxins are transmitted along the food chain and effecting the top predators.

Endophytic Bacteria 
Endophytic bacteria belong to a diverse group of plant endosymbionts and characterized by systematically colonization of plant internal tissues. Generally, the endophytic bacteria are isolated from the plant tissues by surface sterilization of the plant tissue in a sterile environment.  Moreover, the isolation of endophytic bacteria according to their essential needs in niche occupations has been explored. That’s why the endophytic bacterial community can be divided into "passenger" and "true" endophytes. The passenger endophytic bacteria are those who eventually colonize inner tissue of plant by stochastic events while the true endophytes possess adaptive traits because of which they live in association with plants strictly. the in vitro cultivated endophytic bacteria association with plant is considered a more intimate relationship where it helps plant acclimatize to the conditions and promotes health and growth. The endophytic bacteria are considered as plant's essential endosymbionts because virtually all plants harbor it, and these endosymbionts play essential roles in host plant survival. This plant-endosymbiont relation is important in terms of ecology, evolution and diversity. Moreover, the endophytic bacteria such as Sphingomonas sp. and Serratia sp. being isolated from arid land plants regulate endogenous hormone content and promote growth in crop plants.

Archaea as plant endosymbionts 
Archaea are members of most microbiomes. While archaea are highly abundant in extreme environments, they are less abundant and diverse in association with eukaryotic hosts. Nevertheless, archaea are a substantial constituent of plant-associated ecosystems in the aboveground and belowground phytobiome, and play a role in host plant’s health, growth and survival in biotic and abiotic stresses. However, only a few studies have investigated the role of archaea in plant health and its potential symbiosis in ecosystems. Generally, most of the plant endosymbiont related studies focus on fungal or bacterial endosymbionts using metagenomic approaches.

The characterization of archaea is not only limited to crop plants like rice and maize but also identified in many aquatic plant species. The abundance of archaea is different in different tissues for example archaea are more abundant in the rhizosphere than the phyllosphere and endosphere. This archaeal abundance is highly associated with plant species type, environment and plant’s developmental stage. In a study conducted on the detection of plant-genotype specific archaeal and bacterial endophytes, 35% of archaeal sequences were detected in overall sequences (achieved using amplicon sequencing and verified by real time-PCR). The archaeal sequences belong to the phyla Thaumarchaeota, Crenarchaeota, and Euryarchaeota.

Endosymbionts of bacteria

It has been observed that some Betaproteobacteria have Gammaproteobacteria endosymbionts.

Endosymbionts of fungi 
Fungi have been shown to harbor endohyphal bacteria; however, the effects of the bacteria on the fungi are not well studied. Many fungi that harbor these endohyphal bacteria in turn live within plants. These fungi are otherwise known as fungal endophytes. It is hypothesized that the fungi offers a safe haven for the bacteria, and diverse bacteria colonize these refugia creating a micro-ecosystem. These interactions are important because they may impact the way that fungi interact with the environment by modulating their phenotypes.

The way in which the bacteria do this is by altering the gene expression of the fungi. For example, Luteibacter sp. has been shown to naturally infect the ascomycetous endophyte Pestalotiopsis sp. isolated from Platycladus orientalis. The Luteibacter sp. influences the auxin and enzyme production within its host, which, in turn, may influence the effect the fungus has on its plant host. Another interesting example of a bacteria living in symbiosis with a fungus is with the fungus Mortierella. This soil-dwelling fungus lives in close association with a toxin-producing bacteria, Mycoavidus, which helps the fungus to defend against nematodes. This is a very new, but potentially very important, area of study within the study of symbiosis.

Virus-host associations

The human genome project found several thousand endogenous retroviruses, endogenous viral elements in the genome that closely resemble and can be derived from retroviruses, organized into 24 families.

See also 

 Epibiont, organism living on the surface of another organism
 Anagenesis
 Endophyte
 Ectosymbiosis
 List of symbiotic organisms
 List of symbiotic relationships
 Multigenomic organism
 Protocell
 Fungal-bacterial endosymbiosis

References 

Symbiosis
Microbial population biology
Environmental microbiology
Endosymbiotic events